CSC Media Group, formerly known as Chart Show Channels (CSC), was a British cable television broadcasting company.  It was a subsidiary of Sony Pictures Television. The company dissolved on 27 November 2019.

Background
CSC Media Group was named after the now defunct UK music show The Chart Show, which ran on ITV and Channel 4 for twelve years.  CSC evolved from the original Chart Show production company Video Visuals, to Chart Show Channels, which was then acquired in 2007 by private equity group Veronis Suhler Stevenson.

Until Sony acquired the company, they owned sixteen channels, all of which are advertising-funded and free to air (FTA).

History
Chart Show Channels was founded in May 2002. The company's first channel - Chart Show TV, launched on Sky on September 16th of that year, with high viewing figures within its first week of launch. On October 14th, a sister network - Chart Shop TV was launched. This network allowed viewers to purchase CDs and music-related merchandise. It aired on the same broadcast capacity as Chart Show, and aired from 4:00–6:00 am early in the morning during Chart Show's downtime.

In March 2003, Chart Shop TV closed, and its broadcast capacity was used for Video Vault, once again broadcasting late-at-night during Chart Show TV's downtime. On May 30, the company's first children's network - Toons & Tunes soft-launched before fully launching as Pop in July. Video Vault would fully launch that month as The Vault, moving into Pop's broadcast capacity as a nighttime service. In September, a sister channel to Pop - Pop Plus, was launched, which functioned similarly to a timeshift service, although it didn't always air the same programmes as its sister channel. On September 17th, The Vault moved out of Pop's capacity space and gained its own 24-hour slot.

In July 2004, the company's next music channel B4 was launched in Pop Plus' broadcast capacity, broadcasting in its space at night. Pop Plus later re-launched as the pre-school-oriented Tiny Pop at the end of the month.

In 2006, British Sky Broadcasting sold their three music channels Bliss (previously The Amp), Scuzz, and Flaunt to CSC. Formerly encrypted, CSC made the channels FTA like the rest of their channels.

In 2007, they launched five channels; two of which were timeshift channels: Pop +1 and Tiny Pop +1.  The third channel was a new children's channel called Pop Girl, aimed at a young female audience.  The fourth channel was AnimeCentral, which time-shares with Pop Girl, and shows animated series for an older audience; it was the first dedicated channel in the UK for anime broadcasting.  The fifth was Minx, which was a spin-off music channel from the Minx slot shown on Chart Show TV.  Minx was later replaced by NME TV, which is a dedicated indie music channel.

In 2008, they rebranded B4 to Flava after showing a mix of R&B music for a few months prior to this in March.  The channel also went 16:9 widescreen prior to the rebrand, to match the other CSC music channels.  On Tuesday 6 May, they launched Flaunt +1, a 1-hour timeshifted version of Flaunt.  This was their first-ever timeshifted music channel, and is also the second to launch in the UK, after MTV One +1 (now MTV +1) launched in February 2008, replacing MTV Flux.  On Monday 12 May, six days after launching their first music timeshift, Bliss +1, their second music channel timeshift, was launched and their third music channel timeshift, Scuzz +1 launched in November 2008.  It soon closed, and the satellite transponder space was then used by NHK World TV.  On Monday 19 May, they launched their fourth kids channel, replacing Pop +1.  Kix! kit started at 06:00 hours, showing a mixture of cartoons, extreme sports, as well as music, aimed for boys, similar to another kids channel, Jetix.  Currently, it broadcasts from 06:00 to 23:30 daily.  Pop Girl +1, a 1-hour timeshifted version of Pop Girl launched on Wednesday 4 June, replacing their first music channel timeshift, Flaunt +1, which had only been on air just short of four weeks.  AnimeCentral has been replaced with Showcase TV on 27 August 2008, which simulcasts a mixture of channels such as Pop Girl, Chart Show TV, True Movies 2, along with AnimeCentral programming block with repeats of Cowboy Bebop and Ghost in the Shell: Stand Alone Complex.

CSC is the majority owner of Moving Movies Ltd.; with True Movies 1 being the first channel from the company, it launched on 8 April 2005 and was joined by True Movies 2 in March 2006. Both channels showed mainly made-for-TV movies from a range of genres, all based on real-life events and people.

They were announced as being one of the channel providers providing DVB-H channels in a 16 channel trial of the technology in Oxford, a system which would have carried Chart Show TV.

CSC was one of the parties involved in bidding for a low-bandwidth, 18-hour-a-day stream on the UK's digital terrestrial television (DTT) system in November 2005.

Like The Box Plus Network and All Around the World Productions channels, all of CSC's music channels now broadcast 24 hours a day.

In May 2012, CSC launched BuzMuzik, a new music television channel driven by mobile phone (text/mms) and social media.

In February 2013, CSC launched True Entertainment +1, a one-hour timeshift of True Entertainment.  It was replaced by True Drama on 4 June 2013.

On 22 July 2013, Kix Power launched, replacing Pop Girl +1 on Sky.  That was rebranded as Kix +1 on 1 October 2013, rebranded as Kix Power again on Christmas 2013 and Easter 2014; and was renamed Kix + on 22 April 2014.  This timeshift was replaced with Pop +1 on 14 July 2014. Kix Power was renamed as POP Power, and POP Power replaces  Pop Max on Virgin TV.

In late 2013, CSC purchased Starz TV, which was a sole channel by Cloud Television One Limited, following the collapse of Mushroom TV and the sale of Mushroom's all other channels to All Around the World Productions.  In April 2014, CSC closed BuzMuzik, and replaced it with a revival of True Entertainment +1.  The channel also closed for CSC to broadcast Starz TV.

On 26 June 2014, Sony Pictures Television, Sony's TV programming and network unit, said it would buy CSC and its 16 channels for £107 million ($180 million).  The deal was completed on 15 August 2014. All the channels were transferred to Sony Pictures Television, and the company went dormant.

On 13 December 2018, their four remaining music channels were sold to the TRACE Group.

On 27 November 2019, the company was liquidated and dissolved.

List of channels owned by CSC Media Group

Former (Sold to Sony and then Narrative Capital)

Defunct
Note: former channels in light red closed before the start of Sony's deal.

References

 
2002 establishments in England
2019 disestablishments in England
British companies established in 2002
British companies disestablished in 2019
Mass media companies based in London
Mass media companies established in 2006
Mass media companies disestablished in 2019
Sony Pictures Television
2014 mergers and acquisitions
British subsidiaries of foreign companies